George Hebard Williamson (August 15, 1872, Brighton, Colorado – October 10, 1936, Denver) was an American architect.

A number of his works are listed on the National Register of Historic Places.

Works include:
David W. Brown House, 2303 E. Dartmouth Ave., Englewood, Colorado (Williamson, George H.), NRHP-listed 
East High School, 1545 Detroit St., Denver, Colorado (Williamson, George Hebard), NRHP-listed

References

1872 births
1936 deaths
Architects from Colorado
People from Brighton, Colorado
People from Denver